Hambrücken is a municipality in Northern Karlsruhe district in Baden-Württemberg, Germany, located on Bertha Benz Memorial Route. It is twinned with the town and commune of La Bouëxière, France.

References

External links
English translation of Hambrücken website
Hambrücken website
La Bouëxière website
English translation of La Bouëxière website

Karlsruhe (district)